Do the Bambi is Stereo Total's 7th album released in 2005.

Track listing 

Babystrich - 2.43
Do The Bambi - 3.23
Ich Bin Nackt - 2.39
Cinémania - 2.27
Vive Le Week-End - 2.49
Das Erste Mal - 3.47
La Douce Humanité - 3.23
Les Lapins - 2.23
Hunger! - 2.51
Ne M'Appelle Pas Ta Biche - 1.53
Orange Mécanique - 2.43
Tas De Tôle - 2.55
Europa Neurotisch - 2.32
Partymädchen Gefoltert - 1.57
Cannibale - 2.49
Helft Mir - 2.36
Mars Rendezvous - 3.51
Troglodyten - 2.55
Chelsea Girls - 3.00

References

2005 albums
Stereo Total albums